Baccharis klattii is a species of flowering plant in the family Asteraceae that is endemic to Ecuador. Its natural habitats are subtropical or tropical moist montane forests and subtropical or tropical high-altitude shrubland. It is threatened by habitat loss.

References

klattii
Endemic flora of Ecuador
Flora of Esmeraldas Province
Near threatened plants
Plants described in 1944
Taxonomy articles created by Polbot